Billmeier is a surname. Notable people with the surname include:

 Craig Billmeier (born 1973), American musician
 Grant Billmeier (born 1984), European basketball player and coach
 Sarah Billmeier, Austrian para-alpine skier

See also
 Billmeyer